Haven or The Haven may refer to:

 Harbor or haven, a sheltered body of water where ships can be docked

Arts and entertainment

Fictional characters
 Haven (Anita Blake: Vampire Hunter), from the novel series
 Haven (comics), from the X-Men comics
 Haven, from the novel Evermore by Alyson Noel
 Haven, from Fusion comic books

Fictional places
 Haven (fictional town), in the TV series Haven
 Haven, in the fantasy role-playing game Earthdawn
 Haven, in the video game Myst IV: Revelation
 Haven, in the role-playing game Shatterzone
 Haven, associated with the Alliance (DC Comics)
 Haven, in the War World book series 
 Haven, in Stephen King's novel The Tommyknockers

Film and television
 Haven (film), 2004
 Haven (soundtrack)
 Haven (TV series), 2010
 Haven (TV miniseries), 2001, starring Natasha Richardson
 "Haven" (Dark Angel), 2001
 "Haven" (Star Trek: The Next Generation), 1987
 "Haven" (Transformers episode), 2005
 "The Haven" (The Outer Limits), 1999

Music 
 Haven (band), an English indie rock band
 Haven (American band), a Christian metal band
 Haven (Dark Tranquillity album), 2000, and the title track
 Haven (Flook album), 2005
 Haven (Kamelot album), 2015

Gaming 

 Haven (video game), a 2020 role-playing video game
 Haven: Call of the King, a 2002 video game
 Haven: City of Violence, a role-playing game

Books 
 The Haven (novel), a 1909 novel by the British writer Eden Phillpotts
 Haven: The Dramatic Story of 1000 World War II Refugees and How They Came to America, by Ruth Gruber, 1983

Businesses
 Haven (healthcare), an American not-for-profit entity 
 Haven Holidays, a British leisure company
 Haven Hotel, in Dorset, England
 Haven Inc., a shipping logistics company

Schools
 Haven High Academy, Boston, England, UK
 Haven Institute, a residential learning centre in British Columbia, Canada
 Haven Middle School, Evanston, Illinois, US
 Haven USD 312, a school district in Haven, Kansas, US

People 
 Haven (given name), including a list of people with the name
 Haven (surname), including a list of people with the name

Places

United Kingdom 
 The Haven, Boston, the tidal river of the port of Boston
 The Haven, West Sussex
 The Haven, Grimsby, later part of the Port of Grimsby
 The Haven, Hull, later part of the Port of Hull

United States 
 Haven, Kansas
 Haven, New York
 Haven, Washington
 Haven, Wisconsin
 Haven Township, Sherburne County, Minnesota

Elsewhere
 Haven, Victoria, Australia
 Haven Hill, Ross Dependency, Antarctica
 Haven Mountain, Oates Land, Antarctica

Science and technology
 Haven (software), a security application
 Haven (graph theory), a mathematical function

Ships 
 Haven-class hospital ship, a class of U.S. Navy ships
 USS Haven (AH-12)
 , an oil tanker

Other uses 
 Whitehaven R.L.F.C., nicknamed Haven, an English rugby league club

See also 

 De Haven (disambiguation)
 HavenCo, a data hosting services company
 Havens (disambiguation)
 Heaven (disambiguation)